Pierre Lepautre  may refer to:
 Pierre Lepautre (1648–1716), French engraver, who played a role in the development of rococo
 Pierre Lepautre (1659–1744), French sculptor